The 2017–18 Biathlon World Cup – Individual Women started on Wednesday 29 November 2017 in Östersund and finished on Thursday 11 January 2018 in Ruhpolding. The defending titlist was Laura Dahlmeier of Germany.

The small crystal globe winner for the category was Nadezhda Skardino of Belarus.

Competition format
The  individual race is the oldest biathlon event; the distance is skied over five laps. The biathlete shoots four times at any shooting lane, in the order of prone, standing, prone, standing, totalling 20 targets. For each missed target a fixed penalty time, usually one minute, is added to the skiing time of the biathlete. Competitors' starts are staggered, normally by 30 seconds.

2016–17 Top 3 standings

Medal winners

Standings

References

Individual Women